Thomas Beauregard (born February 9, 1986) is a Canadian professional ice hockey player currently playing for the Sorel-Tracy Hawks of the Ligue Nord-Américaine de Hockey (LNAH).

Playing career
He played junior hockey for the Acadie-Bathurst Titan of the Quebec Major Junior Hockey League from 2002 to 2007. Undrafted, Beauregard was invited to the Montreal Canadiens training camp in 2007 where he signed a two-year entry-level contract. He spent most of the next two seasons with the Cincinnati Cyclones of the ECHL.

After playing the next season in the ECHL he joined the Wichita Thunder of the Central Hockey League for the 2011–12 season. He later returned to the ECHL and on October 29, 2012, he transferred from the San Francisco Bulls to the Fort Wayne Komets.

On August 22, 2013, Beauregard returned to the CHL, signing a one-year deal with the Tulsa Oilers.

Career statistics

Regular season and playoffs

References

External links
 
 

1986 births
Living people
Acadie–Bathurst Titan players
Canadian ice hockey right wingers
Cincinnati Cyclones (ECHL) players
EfB Ishockey players
Elmira Jackals (ECHL) players
Fort Wayne Komets players
Hamilton Bulldogs (AHL) players
Rosenborg IHK players
San Francisco Bulls players
Ice hockey people from Montreal
Springfield Falcons players
Wheeling Nailers players
Wichita Thunder players
Canadian expatriate ice hockey players in Denmark
Canadian expatriate ice hockey players in Norway
Canadian expatriate ice hockey players in the United States